Khvosh Maqam (also Romanized as Khvosh Maqām, Khowsh Maqām, and Khūshmaqām; also known as Khushmagām) is a village in Siyah Mansur Rural District, in the Central District of Bijar County, Kurdistan Province, Iran. At the 2006 census, its population was 490, in 107 families. The village is populated by Kurds with an Azerbaijani minority.

References 

Towns and villages in Bijar County
Kurdish settlements in Kurdistan Province